Heywood Island is the largest of the islands off the north coast of Robert Island in the South Shetland Islands, Antarctica.  It is named after Captain Peter Heywood, RN (1773–1831), commanding HMS Nereus off the east coast of South America in 1810–13, formerly a midshipman in HMS Bounty under Captain William Bligh.  The area was visited by early 19th century sealers operating from nearby Clothier Harbour.

Description
It is ice-free, low, and horseshoe-shaped, its west coast indented for 1 km by Vrabcha Cove.

Important Bird Area
Heywood Island has been identified as an Important Bird Area (IBA) by BirdLife International, because it supports one of the largest chinstrap penguin colonies on the Antarctic Peninsula with around 90,000 pairs.

See also 
 List of Antarctic islands south of 60° S

References

External links
 SCAR Composite Antarctic Gazetteer.

Islands of Robert Island
Important Bird Areas of Antarctica
Penguin colonies